Yeduguri Sandinti Sharmila Reddy is an Indian politician who is the founder and president of the YSR Telangana Party. She is the younger sister of Andhra Pradesh Chief Minister Y. S. Jagan Mohan Reddy and the daughter of Y. S. Rajasekhara Reddy and Y. S. Vijayamma. She worked as the party convener for the YSR Congress Party.

Political career

Early political career 

Sharmila made headlines after she took up campaigning on behalf of the YSR Congress Party (YSRCP) along with her mother Y. S. Vijayamma, in the absence of her elder brother Y. S. Jaganmohan Reddy from June 2012 in Andhra Pradesh. YSRCP won 15 of the 18 assembly seats and 1 of 1 Parliament seat for which the by-elections were held.

Sharmila began her  at Idupulapaya in Kadapa district on 18 October 2012. She completed it on 4 August 2013 in Ichchapuram. She toured 14 districts as part of the walkathon.

Before the 2019 Andhra Pradesh Legislative Assembly election, Sharmila undertook an 11-day bus Yatra across Andhra Pradesh in branded buses with a “Bye Bye Babu” timer clock, suggesting that it was time for the then Chief Minister N. Chandrababu Naidu. The campaign under the name “Praja Theerpu - Bye Bye Babu” covered  and 39 public addresses. She also handed out over 20,000 autographed caps.

YSR Telangana Party 
In February 2021, Sharmila alleged that she had political differences with her brother, Jagan Mohan Reddy, who is the chief of YSRCP, and claimed there is no presence of the party in the state of Telangana.

On 9 April 2021, Sharmila has announced that she would launch a new political party on 8 July 2021 in Telangana. She chose the date as it is the birth date of her father, Rajasekhara Reddy. Ahead of the party's launch, she has started campaigning against the incumbent Bharat Rashtra Samithi (BRS) government.

On 8 July 2021, she announced the formation of YSR Telangana Party.

Personal life
Sharmila was born into a  Christian Reddy political-business family to Y. S. Rajasekhara Reddy and Vijayamma in Hyderabad. Her husband Morusupalli Anil Kumar is an evangelist and founder of Anil World Evangelism. The couple has two children. Sharmila has an elder brother Jagan Mohan Reddy, who is the current Chief Minister of Andhra Pradesh. She resides in Hyderabad.

Family tree

References

External links
 

YSR Congress Party politicians
Women in Andhra Pradesh politics
Living people
Indian Christians
21st-century Indian women politicians
People from Hyderabad, India
Telugu politicians
Politicians from Hyderabad, India
Women in Telangana politics
Year of birth missing (living people)